BRX may refer to:
 Cadillac BRX, a concept car
 BRX, the IATA code for María Montez International Airport
 brx, the ISO 639-3 code of the Boro language of India
 Bahrain Raid Xtreme, motorsports rally team
 Brixton railway station, London, National Rail station code
 BRX, abbreviation for BREVIS RADIX, a plant-specific gene and protein